Cañones is a census-designated place  in Rio Arriba County, New Mexico, United States. Its population was 118 as of the 2010 census. Cañones had a post office until it closed on January 3, 2002.

Demographics

2020 Census 
The town had 85 people in the 2020 census.

Description

The origins of the community trace back to 1766, when Juan Pablo Martín Serrano was awarded the Polvadera Grant. Serrano was a wealthy military veteran with a large family, and established a seasonal rancho in the canyon, raising livestock, farming the canyon bottom, and trading with the Utes. Permanent settlement seems to have begun with Juan Bautista Valdez, who bought a grant at the present location of Cañones in 1807.

Cañones was visited by anthropologists Paul Kutsche and John R. Van Ness in the 1960s, who considered the community typical of what they called the Rio Arriba subculture of Hispanic New Mexico. They concluded that this subculture was characterized by communal land grants, small economies, campanilismo (community spirit), and a fair degree of social equality.

During the time Kutsche and Van Ness were guests in the community, the state closed the one-room school and ordered the children to attend school in Coyote, which meant busing the students several miles over a very bad road. The parents refused en masse to send their children to school in Coyote, and the subsequent legal battle seems to have revolved around the issue of whether the parents were acting on legitimate concerns for their children's safety or were using the children to pressure the state into building a better road into the community. The parents were fined for truancy, but the community now has an acceptable paved road.

The ruins of Tsiping or Tsi’pinouinge, is found on Pueblo Mesa just south of Cañones. The settlement was active during the Classic stage, between 1200 CE and 1325 CE, and at its peak the settlement had 335 to 400 ground floor rooms and sixteen kivas surrounding a central plaza. Visitors to the ruins are encouraged to approach along a trail from Polvadera Mesa rather than through Cañones, out of respect for the privacy of the residents.

See also

 List of census-designated places in New Mexico

References

External links

Census-designated places in New Mexico
Census-designated places in Rio Arriba County, New Mexico